Anadara broughtonii is a species of Ark clam. The species was described by Shrenck in 1867.  Originally belonging to the genus Scapharca, the genus has merged with Anadara now.

Adult blood clams can reach a shell length of 100 mm and are commercially harvested in China, Japan, and Korea as a source of sashimi. To develop both the scientific research and improve the aquaculture of blood clams, a chromosomal-level genome assembly of the S. broughtonii genome has been sequenced and assembled, producing a 884.5-Mb genome.

Distribution
The species is distributed in Far East, from Russia down to Korea, Mainland China, Japan and Taiwan.

References

External links

broughtonii
Molluscs described in 1867